Harald Mothes (born 28 November 1956) is a German retired footballer who played as a forward or midfielder.

He played over 300 games for Erzgebirge Aue in the DDR-Oberliga. Mothes also won one cap for East Germany.

References

External links
 
 
 

1956 births
Living people
German footballers
East German footballers
East Germany international footballers
DDR-Oberliga players
Association football forwards